Carolus Rex frequently refers to King Charles XII of Sweden

Carolus Rex means King Charles in Latin. It may refer to:

 King Charles (disambiguation), kings named Charles, whence in some English documents are referred to with their latinate titles "Carolus Rex"
 Carolus Rex (bastion), a portion of the Gothenburg city wall
 Carolus Rex (album), a 2012 album by Sabaton
 Carolus Rex March or Marcia Carolus Rex (King Karl March), a Swedish military march composed by Wilhelm Harteveld

See also

 Charles Rex (disambiguation)

 Carolus (disambiguation)
 Rex (disambiguation)